Thaumatodon multilamellata was a species of minute air-breathing land snail, a terrestrial pulmonate gastropod mollusk in the family Endodontidae. This species was endemic to (found only in) the Cook Islands, but it now appears to be extinct.

References

Endodontidae
Extinct gastropods
Gastropods described in 1887
Taxonomy articles created by Polbot